Ruckerville is an unincorporated community in Clark County, in the U.S. state of Kentucky.

History
A post office called Ruckerville was established in 1850, and remained in operation until 1909. The community derives its name from Reuben Rucker, an original owner of the town site.

References

Unincorporated communities in Clark County, Kentucky
Unincorporated communities in Kentucky